Gateway 2 is the second album by Gateway, a trio composed of John Abercrombie, Dave Holland and Jack DeJohnette. It was recorded in 1977 and released on the ECM label in 1978.

Reception 
The Penguin Guide to Jazz called it "less effective" than the group's previous album "with Abercrombie riffling rather desperately through his electrical shade cards. DeJohnette, as always is flawless". The Allmusic review by Scott Yanow states "the playing on the five group originals is generally more fiery than introspective. None of the individual selections are all that memorable but the group improvising does have plenty of surprising moments".

Track listing
 "Opening" (John Abercrombie/Dave Holland/Jack DeJohnette) – 16:17
 "Reminiscence" (Holland) – 4:32
 "Sing Song" (Abercrombie) – 6:55
 "Nexus" (Holland) – 7:55
 "Blue" (DeJohnette) – 8:14
Recorded in July 1977 at Talent Studio, Oslo, Norway

Personnel 
 John Abercrombie – electric guitar, acoustic guitar, electric mandolin
 Jack DeJohnette – drums, piano
 Dave Holland – bass

References 

1978 albums
Gateway (band) albums
ECM Records albums
Albums produced by Manfred Eicher